PTO may stand for:

Organisations
 Patent and Trademark Office (disambiguation), a government office that handles the issuing of both patents and trademarks
 Parent teacher organization, organization that consists of parents, teachers and school staff
 Peace Train Organisation, a campaign group set up in response to the repeated bombing of the Dublin to Belfast railway line
 Professional Triathletes Organisation, an organisation that representing non-drafting professional triathletes
 Public Telecommunications Operator, a service provider of telecommunications services such as telephony and data communications access

Entertainment
 PTO: Pacific Theater of Operations, a war strategy simulation series by Koei based on the World War II events
 "P:T:O:", a track from the 1977 Klaus Schulze album Body Love
 The Phantom of the Opera (adaptations), The Phantom of the Opera — the original novel or an adaptation (movie/musical/literature) or the Phantom character from any of these
 Please Turn Over, a 1959 British comedy film
 Promenade Theatre Orchestra, an English quartet founded in 1969

Other
 Pacific Theater of Operations, World War II
 Paid time off, time an employee can draw from to take time off from work, without having to specify a reason
Parietal-temporal-occipital association area, this association area is responsible for the assembly of auditory, visual, and somatosensory system information
 Peeled tail-on shrimp
 Permeability Tuned Oscillator is an electronic circuit whose resonant frequency is altered by moving a sintered iron powder core in and out of the tuning coil.
 Permission to officiate, a limited form of license to undertake ecclesiastical duties within the Church of England
 Phoenix Thunderbirds Open, a golf tournament on the LPGA Tour from 1962 to 1965
Please Turn Over, used on a printed document to tell reader to turn over and continue reading
 Power take-off,  a splined driveshaft, usually on a tractor or truck, that can be used to provide power to an attachment or separate machine
 Professional tryout, a type of contract in professional ice hockey
 pto, ISO 639-3 language code for the Zo'é language

See also